The National Library of Tunisia (Arabic: المكتبة الوطنية التونسية) is the legal deposit and copyright library for Tunisia. It was founded in 1885, then known as the French Library, and then the People's library. The Tunisian government assigned a budget of 28 million Dinars for a new building for the library, and in 2005 the library was relocated.The library is 70m tall and it is composed of 14 floors it is one of the tallest buildings in Tunisia and one of the most famous Islamic style building in Tunisia

History
Founded in 1885, this library was called French Library. Its present name dates from the beginning of independence of Tunisia. In 2005, it was relocated to its present location, Boulevard 9 avril, just near the National Archives of Tunisia and some higher institutions like the Faculty of Social and Human Sciences.

Bibliography
  
 . (Includes information about the national library)

References

External links
Official site 

Library buildings completed in 2005
Government of Tunisia
Tunisia
Libraries in Tunisia